Tezozomoctzin was a son of Itzcoatl, the fourth Aztec ruler (tlatoani) of Tenochtitlan.

Tezozomoctzin never became ruler himself, but he was married to Atotoztli II, daughter his cousin of Moctezuma I (the fifth ruler)

They had three sons that each would become rulers: Axayacatl, Tizoc, and Ahuitzotl — would become the sixth, seventh and eighth rulers, respectively. A fourth son Huitzilihuitl is listed in the genealogy, but was never ruler and has no listed children.

His daughter Chalchiuhnenetzin married Moquihuix, ruler of Tlatelolco altepetl.

References

Aztec nobility
15th-century indigenous people of the Americas
Nobility of the Americas